William, Willy, Billy or Bill Hanson may refer to:

Sports
William Hanson (cricketer) (born 1982), English cricketer
Bill Hanson (basketball) (born c. 1940), pro basketball player
Bill Hanson (footballer) (1893–1946), Australian rules footballer

Others
William Hanson (engineer) (1810–1875), railway and water engineer in South Australia, brother of Richard Davies Hanson
William F. Hanson (1887-1969), music composer
William Cook Hanson (1909–1995), United States federal judge
C. William Hanson, American internist, anesthesiologist and intensivist

See also
William Hansen (disambiguation)
William Hanson Dodge (1866–1932), American photographer